Palaeontinoidea is an extinct superfamily of cicadomorph hemipteran insects. This superfamily contains three families.

Description
Palaeontinoids were comparatively large, cicada-like insects that existed from the Upper Permian to the Middle Cretaceous (around 260.4 to 112.0 million years ago).

Subdivisions
The three families classified under Palaeontinoidea, along with their age range and collection sites, are the following:

Mesogereonidae Tillyard, 1921
Upper Triassic; Australia and South Africa. Contains two monophyletic genera.
Dunstaniidae Tillyard, 1916
Upper Permian to Lower Jurassic; South Africa, Australia, France, Central Asia, and China.
Palaeontinidae Handlirsch, 1906
Upper Triassic to Middle Cretaceous; Brazil, China, Russia, Germany, the Transbaikal region, Tajikistan, Turkmenistan, Kyrgyzstan, Kazakhstan, Spain, Germany, and the United Kingdom. Contains around 30 to 40 genera and about a hundred species.

See also

Prehistoric Lepidoptera
Prehistoric insects

References

Prehistoric insects
Extinct Hemiptera
Permian insects
Triassic insects
Jurassic insects
Cretaceous insects
Cisuralian animals
Cisuralian animals of North America
Cisuralian first appearances
Cretaceous extinctions
Taxa named by Anton Handlirsch
†Palaeontinoidea
†Palaeontinoidea